"Shy Boy" is a 1982 song recorded by English girl group Bananarama which was written and produced by the production team of Steve Jolley and Tony Swain and marked the first in a long line of studio collaborations between them and Bananarama. Released in the summer of 1982, "Shy Boy" became the third consecutive single by Bananarama to hit the top-five, reaching number four in the UK singles chart.  It also was a success in Australia, where it reached number two, becoming their first top 40 hit in that country.  Top-ten success also followed in New Zealand and Canada.  "Shy Boy" charted well on the U.S. Hot Dance Club Play chart and was the first of Bananarama's singles to dent the Billboard Hot 100, peaking at number 83. The song was known as "Shy Boy (Don't It Make You Feel Good)" in the USA.

It was included on their 1983 debut album Deep Sea Skiving. The song was originally called "Big Red Motorbike", however Bananarama did not like the lyrics and changed it to "Shy Boy".

Music video
The music video was directed by Midge Ure and Chris Cross who were then members of the group Ultravox. It featured the girls giving a nerdy guy a make-over, turning him into a stud. When his new look attracts the attention of a sexy secretary, the girls get revenge by dousing him with a bucket of water. The nerd-turned-stud was played Terry Sharpe, the lead vocalist of the Northern Irish rock group The Adventures, who was Sara Dallin's boyfriend at the time.

Track listing

 UK 7" vinyl single
London Records NANA 2
"Shy Boy"  3:13
"Don't Call Us"  3:10

 Canadian 7" vinyl single
Mercury Records MS 76178
"Shy Boy"  3:13
"Give Us Back Our Cheap Fares"  2:45
S. Dallin/S. Fahey/K. Woodward/Cotillard

 UK 12" vinyl single
London Records NANX 2
"Shy Boy" (Extended Version)  5:49
"Don't Call Us" (Extended Version)  4:10

 USA 12" vinyl single
London Records 810 299-1
"Shy Boy (Don't it Make You Feel Good)" (Long Version)  6:58
"Shy Boy (Don't it Make You Feel Good)" (Dub Version)  9:22

The song "Don't Call Us" appears on the album Deep Sea Skiving retitled as "Boy Trouble".

Chart performance

Weekly charts

Year-end charts

References 

1982 singles
Bananarama songs
London Records singles
Songs written by Tony Swain (musician)
Songs written by Steve Jolley (songwriter)
Song recordings produced by Jolley & Swain
1982 songs